Zulesk (also Romanized as Z̄ūlesk; also known as Zahisk, Zolisk, and Zūleng) is a village in Momenabad Rural District, Central District, Sarbisheh County, South Khorasan Province, Iran. At the 2006 census, its population was 236, in 63 families.

References 

Populated places in Sarbisheh County